The genesis of the 1992 Zangon Kataf Crises could at least be traced to the onset of the British imperial regime in the Northern Region of Nigeria, in which the Atyap people began reporting loss of a land to the Hausas. In 1922, it was reported that a large piece of land was acquired by the Emir of Zaria, Dalhatu Uthman Yero, who failed to compensate the indigenous population of the region. In 1966, the land was provided to the Hausa trading settlement in the heart of Mabatado (pronounced Mabǝrǝdǝu), called "Zangon Kataf", by the emir, Muhammad Usman. The Atyap resided within the district, in the Zaria Province of the Northern Region of, initially, British Nigeria, which became independent Nigeria. It was to remain utilized as a marketplace, where the indigenous Atyap people were banned from trading pork and beer by the settlers.

Tensions steadily increased, flaring up in February 1992 over a proposal to move the market to a new site, away from land transferred to the Hausas. The proposal by the first Atyap head of the Zangon Kataf Local Government Area was favored by the Atyap, who could trade beer and pork on the neutral site; however, it remained opposed by the Hausa, who feared the loss of trading privileges. Over 60 people were killed in the February clashes; further violence broke out in Zango on May 15 and May 16, with 400 people killed and numerous buildings destroyed. When the news reached Kaduna, rampaging Hausa youths killed many Christians of all ethnic groups in retaliation.

In January 1992, the first indigenous local government Chairman, A.C.P. Juri Babang Ayok (retired), announced plans for relocating the same market to a neutral site where all indigenous individuals and settlers would be free to trade; this would thereby reduce the Hausa monopoly and decongest the old market, which suffered from unhygienic conditions because of the very slight distance between businesses. However, this move was unpopular with Muslim northern settlers. The proposed move began to serve as fuel for rising tensions between Muslims and their Atyap hosts, who welcomed the initiative for a market move.

February 1992 crisis
A Hausa resident of the Zango region, Alhaji Danbala A.T.K., reportedly took the issue to court, in a bid to stop the market being moved to a new site; however, this court case continued without success. On February 6, 1992, as trade commenced within the novel market, it was reported that Danbala organized a Hausa/Fulani mob at the new market site, murdering an Atyap man, Shan Anwai. This event led to the initiation of a riot. According to official figures, 95 people were killed, 252 injured, 133 houses burnt or destroyed and 26 farmland enterprises destroyed.

A commission of enquiry, directed by Justice Rahila Cudjoe, was established by the Kaduna State Government for the completion of research on the cause of the crisis.

May 1992 crisis
According to news sources, the Atyap village heads then threatened to recapture the land forcefully taken by the emir Yero in 1922 and given to the Hausas. In response to this threat, the Hausa population began to uproot recently planted crops on Atyap land. Several Atyap individuals were attacked and killed on their farms. The Izalaru Islamic Group, a Hausa and Fulani group, requested assistance from the Sultan of Sokoto, Ibrahim Dasuki, for the completion of a jihad against the Atyap. Reports of police failing to arrest and prosecute those implicated in the February incidents began to circulate. At the same time, Hausa and Fulani groups disseminated allegations that the Cudjoe commission had manipulated the process, reportedly boycotted by the Atyap.

The issues of the uprooting of crops on Atyap farmlands and the killing of Atyap people on their farms began the second crisis, which lasted from May 15 to 16, 1992. When rumors of events within Zangon Kataf reached Kaduna, Zaria, Ikara and other regions within the state where Hausa populations remained persecuted, rampaging Hausa and Fulani youths began killing many Christians from all ethnic groups in retaliation.

Kaduna, Birnin Gwari, and Ikara

The Hausa of Kaduna were the first to respond to the call; Hausa youths took to the streets, killing and burning houses belonging to the Atyap and other non-Atyap Christians in Tudun Wada, Ungwar Muazu, Kawo, Rigasa and other areas. According to official figures, 250 individuals were killed, more than the total within Zangon Kataf; similar events occurred within Birnin Gwari and Ikara, northwest and northeast of Kaduna, respectively.

Zaria: Riots within the Zaria region began on Sunday, May 17, 1992, when the Christian Association of Nigeria's (CAN) secretary, Rev. Bitrus Katung, was hacked inside his house by rampaging Hausa youths. An Atyap man in the next house, and one Koro man opposite Katung's house, was also murdered. Houses were burnt in Gyellesu. In Tudun Wada, a Bajju man, Baba Maigemu, was also murdered. The New York Times reported that at least 46 corpses were brought into the Ahmadu Bello Teaching Hospital.

Casualties
According to official figures, the May 1992 tragedy was said to have claimed 471 lives (250 in Kaduna, 188 in Zangon Kataf and the other 33 from Zaria, Ikara and other areas), 518 persons injured, 229 houses burnt or destroyed and 218 vehicles destroyed or burnt. Although the Zango Hausa community claimed to have lost 1,528 persons, many Hausas reportedly fled the Zangon Kataf area afterward; some subsequently returned. Africa Watch reported on a visit to Zangon Kataf in April 1993; the organisation stated that a year ago, the then Head-of-state General Babangida reportedly visited Zangon Kataf a few days after the riot in May 1992. During this visit, he promised to compensate those who had their houses destroyed. Africa Watch reported that "it was clear that the government was engaged in rebuilding the Hausa community".

Inquiry and trials

Inquiry

In a report issued on March 30, 1993, Africa Watch described the arrest and trial of retired Maj. Gen. Zamani Lekwot and six others following the riots in Zango-Kataf and Kaduna. In the Justice Rahila Cudjoe Commission of Inquiry, attorneys representing both the Atyap and the Hausa-Fulani presented their reports before the commission. Five of the panel members were Hausa-Fulani and the reports by the commission were not immediately made public. In the wake of the riot in May 1992, hundreds of Atyap people were arrested. At least 21 were left in detention with no formal charges laid or with no trial conducted, under Decree 2 of 1984, while many other individuals were released.

The Atyap community representatives pointed out that the main people arrested by the government were Atyap leaders, including the local government Chairman - A.C.P. Juri B. Ayok (rtd), the District Head, Bala Ade Dauke Gora, several village heads, and Major General Zamani Lekwot (rtd.); according to the community representatives, these individuals were not arrested for any criminal act, but because of their positions of authority in society. Lekwot's arrest was said to be the result of a feud between him and President Babangida.

On May 20, 1992, the military government officially banned all ethno-religious and regional associations which supported political candidates, thereby worsening the already tense situation existing between the Hausas and other smaller indigenous groups in Kaduna State. These groups resorted to forming underground units to assist them in achieving their political ambitions. Following the crisis in May, the state government altered the authority of the Cudjoe Commission, adding the events which occurred in May to the existing purview of the commission.. Because of the perception of bias against the Atyap community within the commission, the lawyers representing them boycotted the inquiries' commission.

Two special tribunals, intended to bypass the standard courts, were prepared by the federal military government to try individuals accused of participating in crimes during the riots. This act was frowned upon by lawyers of the Nigerian Bar, as it was perceived as a move to manipulate the justice system in favor of a particular group.

On June 2, 1992, the first tribunal was enacted; this was chaired by Justice Benedict Okadigbo, with members of the panel including such individuals as: Godwin Graham-Douglas, Alhaji Aminu Malumfashi, Hajia Tani Yusuf, Otunba A. Adeleke Adedoyin, Col. Yusuf Abubakar and Mustapha Wali. The Civil Disturbances (Special Tribunal) Decree No. 53 of 1987, which provided the authority necessary for the establishment of the tribunal, only allowed for a maximum of five members, as pointed out by lawyers; however, the government, following the establishment of the initial tribunal, amended the decree and applied it retroactively, allowing two more persons to be added for a total of seven. This first panel, also identified as the Okadigbo tribunal, included: three Muslim Hausa/Fulani and a military officer; a retired Muslim police officer; and a Christian by the name Godwin Alaye Graham-Douglas. This last individual remained a senior advocate of Nigeria (SAN), who later withdrew from the tribunal; he attributed his absence to a medical condition. The remaining members of the panel produced a decision regardless of his endorsement.

On October 8, 1992, the second tribunal, chaired by Emmanuel Adegbite with panel members included: N. N. Onugha, B. A. Njemanze, Lt. Col. Yakubu Bako, Alhaji Sule Baba Mohammed, Chief L. O. Okoi, and Issac Zakari Dimka. The president, Gen. Ibrahim Babangida, then declared that there would be a presumption of guilt on all those accused by the tribunal in obvious violation of the law which stipulates the right to be presumed innocent until proven guilty,  International Criminal law, and also found in Article 7 of the Human and Peoples' Rights of the African Charter.

Trials

The 13 people from the Zangon Kataf area sentenced to death, were all of Atyap ethnic descent.

On April 4, 1992, the trial of Major General Lekwot and that of his co-accused case began. They were charged with "unlawful assembly, rioting, rioting with arms, and disturbance of public peace". The chairman of the tribunal, Justice Okadigbo, reportedly showed open contempt towards the Chief G. O. K. Ajayi (SAN)-led defense counsel, with another team of the counsel, barrister Emmanuel Toro, expressing his belief that the tribunal was "hell-bent on convicting".

On February 2, 1993, six of the seven accused were sentenced to death by the tribunal. These included: Maj. Gen. Zamani Lekwot (rtd),  Maj. James Atomic Kude (rtd),  Yunana Karau,  Markus Maman,  Yahaya Duniyo, and Julius T. Sarki (the village head of Zaman Dabo i.e. Atak Nfang). These decisions by the panel were not subject to appeal, except for a final endorsement by the National Defense Security Council (NDSC) whose made the final decision on the executions. As noted by Emmanuel Toro, "The ruling of the tribunal is still a mystery", being that the decisions of the later disbanded Okadigbo tribunal were never made public even to the attorneys of the individuals convicted and held in the Kaduna Prison, the Abeokuta Prison and the Port Harcourt Prison (as in the case of Major Gen. Lekwot).

Five other accused persons in April 1993 remained in prison after being tried twice. Convicted by the Okadigbo tribunal of unlawful assembly, and by the Adegbite tribunal, they included:  Adamu Shekari (the village head in the Zango-Kataf area)—sentenced to three years imprisonment and Peter T. Lekwot (brother of Maj. Gen. Zamani Lekwot)—sentenced to five years imprisonment. Despite their claims of innocence—Peter Lekwot had several witnesses testify that he was in Kaduna attending a meeting when the incident began, and Adamu Shekari who was also in another city at the time, their appeals were never listened to. The other three, namely:  Zamani Kazah,  Hon. Shekarau Kaah and Sani Adam Jankasa were all acquitted by the Okadigbo tribunal probably because they were all elderly men. (Zamani Kazah the local deputy chairman of the Social Democratic Party (SDP), who was the oldest of them, was at least 80 years old at the time.) The Adegbite tribunal put these five on trial again with charges including culpable homicide. This tribunal later acquitted Adamu Shekari and Peter Lekwot on grounds they were absent from the crime scene at the time of the event, but convicting and sentencing the other three previously acquitted by the Okadigbo tribunal to death. They were then moved to the infirmary unit of the Federal Prison in Abeokuta because they were of an advanced age.

At least four others were condemned to death by the tribunals, including: Iliya (Elias) Manza, Ayuba Tache, Jonathan S. Yashim, and Inspector Gankon Dawa Kurfi (rtd). Elias Manza was sentenced to death by the Okadigbo tribunal, while the remaining three were sentenced to death by the Adegbite tribunal. Only three Hausa-Fulanis were tried by either of the two tribunals and, according to their attorney, Mahmood Yahaya, were all acquitted and released.

Among the seven Atyap acquitted by the tribunals although remaining in the Kaduna Prison in custody under Decree 2 of 1984 (which authorized detention without trial), for a while before their later release, include: A.C.P. Juri B. Ayok (rtd.),  John Y. Toro,  Insp. Timothy Shelu Adam (rtd),
Jonah Abashe,  Bala Ninyio Bawa,  Ayuba Yashim, and Tauna Yakubu.

After the outbreak of the riot the Kaduna State governor immediately removed the Zangon Kataf local government chairman, A.C.P. Juri B. Ayok (rtd.), a member of the SDP who as of June 1993 was the only one in the Zamani Lekwot group to be acquitted of all charges. The governor, a member of the opposition National Republican Convention (NRC) party replaced him with a member of the NRC, Mallam Haruna Zok. He also replaced Ayok's deputy and replaced him with another opposition NRC member without holding a by-election six months after the removal of Ayok and his deputy, which was against the constitution's provisions, and despite a case being filed by lawyers from the Atyap community, challenging the unconstitutional removal, nothing was achieved.

In February 1993, a suit was presented before a Lagos High Court by the local human rights group, the Constitutional Rights Project (CRP), seeking a delay in the Lekwot group executions pending a hearing of their earlier petition filed before the African Commission on Human and Peoples' Rights. A Nigerian human rights lawyer, Chief Mike A. A. Ozekhome, also filed a lawsuit at the same time in the same court seeking to revoke the death sentences. On May 5, 1993, Ozekhome was ruled by the court to lack the locus standi to bring his case. However, it agreed to the CPR's suit, extending a stay of execution on the Lekwot cases to June 7, 1993.

Contrary to prevailing fears, the federal military government did not execute those sentenced to death until Gen. Babangida's tenure elapsed. Even when the interim government headed by Chief Ernest Shonekan came in on August 26, 1993, nothing was done. When General Sani Abacha came into power on November 17, 1993, he did not act on the issue but awaited the final outcome of the African Commission, which discovered gross violations of judicial processes by the tribunals and the outgoing military regime and asked for the release of the convicted men from detention. This, the Abacha regime granted, and they were released in 1996.

Others
The others implicated in one or the other crisis or who played a role in either of Atyap origin, not mentioned above include:  Kato Yashim,  Tonak Dabo, James Gandu,  Haruna Bityong,  Philip Abu,  Bala Bonet, Bitrus Kwasau,  and Bala N. Bawa. Two other lawyers who played a vital role for the Atyap community were Barrister (Col.) Y. A. Madaki (rtd.) and Barrister Bitrus Duniyo.

See also
 2019 Kaduna State massacre
 List of massacres in Nigeria
 Southern Kaduna

References

Further reading
 
 
 

1990s massacres in Nigeria
1992 in Nigeria
Massacres in 1992
Atyap chiefdom
1992 murders in Nigeria